Peter LaSalle  (born 1947) is an American novelist, short story writer, and travel essayist.

Life
He graduated from Harvard University with a B.A. in 1969, and the University of Chicago with an M.A. in 1972.

His books include the novels  Mariposa's Song and Strange Sunlight; the short story collections Tell Borges If You See Him , Hockey Sur Glace,  The Graves of Famous Writers,  What I Found Out About Her,  and  Sleeping Mask: Fictions; and two collections of essays on literary travel,  The City at Three P.M.: Writing, Reading, and Traveling and The World Is a Book, Indeed. 

His fiction has appeared in magazines and journals such as Agni, Antioch Review, Paris Review,  Tin House, New England Review, Virginia Quarterly Review, Yale Review, Zoetrope: All-Story, and others. His essays, articles, and book reviews have appeared in The Nation, The Progressive, Worldview, Commonweal, The New York Times Book Review, The Chicago Sun-Times, The Los Angeles Times,  and others.

He teaches at the University of Texas at Austin, where he is the Susan Taylor McDaniel Regents Professor in Creative Writing in the Department of English and a resident faculty member at the Michener Center for Writers.

Awards

 Flannery O'Connor Award for Tell Borges If You See Him
  Richard Sullivan Prize in Short Fiction for What I Found Out About Her
  The Antioch Review Award for Distinguished Prose
  O. Henry Award 
 National Endowment for the Arts Creative Writing Fellowship

Works

Books

Anthologies (work included in)

References

External links
"An Interview with Peter LaSalle", Bookslut, March 2008

American short story writers
University of Texas at Austin faculty
Living people
Harvard University alumni
1947 births
University of Chicago alumni